Shota Arai may refer to:
 Shota Arai (footballer, born 1985) (新井 翔太), Japanese footballer
 Shota Arai (footballer, born 1988) (新井 章太), Japanese footballer